Maxime Cressy and Bernardo Saraiva were the defending champions but lost in the quarterfinals to Roberto Maytín and Jackson Withrow.

Maytín and Withrow won the title after defeating Hans Hach Verdugo and Donald Young 6–7(4–7), 7–6(7–2), [10–5] in the final.

Seeds

Draw

References

External links
 Main draw

Columbus Challenger II - Doubles
Columbus Challenger